Samant or Sawad (or Saund, Saud) were the feudal kings of the Doti region, which was formed after the disintegration of Katyuri kingdom of Uttarakhand and far western region of Nepal during the 13th century.

The Saud title was given by the Raika king. During the reign of Raika king, Saud were ranked after king.  it is known as the warrior kshatriya caste and found widely in Garhwal, Kumaon and Far-western region  of Nepal. Some Sawad/Saund were migrated to Kalikot, Kailali and Kanchanpur district from Doti, Achham, Bajura, Bajhang, Dadeldhura, Darchula and Baitadi District of Nepal.

They use twenty surnames according to place. 
1. Malasi Malla Samant (Claims as a Suryavanshi rajput)
2. Sunkoti Samant
3. Gora Samant
4. Katyuri Samant
5. Karudel Samant
6. Tebhare Samant
7. Timal Samant
8. Paltel Samant
9. Siyabani (Sobarna) Samant
10.Kuskota Samant
11.navrath Samant
12.Amel Samant
13. Ghighidel Samant
14.Suma Samant
15.Deupadi Samant
16. Hari Samant
17.Puri Samant
18.Aalvi Samant
19.Vaalvi Samant
20.Sukili Samant

Notable
 Bharat Sawad (1968–?), Nepalese weightlifter
 Chandra Sawad (born 1991), Nepalese cricketer
 Narayan Prakash Saud, Nepalese politician 
 Nar Bahadur Saud, Nepalese writer

See also
Mahara
Rawat
Bisht
 Airee
Bohra
Budha
 Dhami
 Rokaya

References

History of Nepal
13th century in Nepal
Surnames of Nepalese origin
Nepali-language surnames